Dalton Pass, also called Balete Pass, is a zigzag road and mountain pass that joins the provinces of Nueva Ecija and Nueva Vizcaya, in central Luzon island of the Philippines. It is part of Cagayan Valley Road segment of Pan-Philippine Highway (Maharlika Highway).

Geography

The headwaters of the Digdig River originate just south of the pass. Balete Ridge starts two miles to the west-northwest of the pass, with a high point at Mt. Imugan (5,580 feet), and extends nine miles to the east-southeast, where it ends at Mt. Kabuto (4,600 feet ).

Dalton Pass is a gateway to the Cagayan Valley, and the Ifugao Rice Terraces.

Battle of Balete Pass

The Japanese strategy during the Battle of Luzon was to fight a delaying retreat from Baguio to Bayombong, and then to a final defensive position in Kiangan, Ifugao.  The pass was the only access between Central Luzon and the Cagayan Valley, and was the scene of much bloody fighting in the Battle of Luzon, during the final stages of World War II.

Balete Pass lies along Highway 5 from San Jose City and Santa Fe, and became a defensive position for Tomoyuki Yamashita's forces.  A similar defensive battle was fought at Salacsac Pass, along the Villa Verde Trail joining San Nicolas and Santa Fe.

Japanese Gen. Yoshiharu Iwanaka's 2nd Tank Division fought a retreating battle from San Jose to Dupax, before confronting the American 32nd Division, under the command of Maj. Gen. William H. Gill, at Salacsac Pass in early March 1945.  That left the Japanese 10th Division, under the command of Lt. Gen. Yasuyuki Okamoto, to confront the American 25th Division, under the command of Maj. Gen. Charles L. Mullins, at Balete Pass.

According to Ogawa, "When Balete was about to be captured, those unable to move were left to die after much pain and agony.  Some of the more fortunate were given potassium cyanide or hand grenades to dispose of themselves quickly."  The Americans took the Balete area on 31 May 1945.

The Japanese lost 7,750 at Balete Pass, and 5,410 at Salacsac Pass.  The Battle of Balete Pass incurred the death of 685, and the wounding of 2,090, 25th Division American soldiers between 21 Feb. and 31 May 1945. The Battle of Villa Verde Trail, or the Battle of Salacsac Pass, cost the American 32nd Division, 825 killed, and 2,160 wounded. The casualties among Filipino Commonwealth regulars, Constabulary and guerrillas were 285 killed and 1,134 wounded in battle. The Japanese 10th Division and 2nd Tank Division were finished as effective combat units.

The pass is named for General James Dalton II, who was killed by a sniper during the battle.

Balete Pass Tourism Complex

The Balete Pass Tourism Complex is in the summit area of the pass. The "National Shrine of the Battle of Balete" and other monuments and memorials honor the war losses. The shrine is at the highest point at the "Dalton Pass Viewpoint with Shed" provincial project, which offers long vistas of the mountains and forests.

Flora
The Dalton Pass area is home to the only critically endangered orchid of Nueva Ecija, Ceratocentron fesselii, which is endemic to the province. It has orange flowers with purple lips and that glows lightly at dark. It is threatened by illegal logging, and illegal collecting for the orchid trade in the international black market.

The national government has yet to dedicate the natural Dalton Pass habitat as a nature reserve to protect the endemic orchid, leaving extinction of the orchid in the wild a threat.

See also

List of American guerrillas in the Philippines
Battle of Bessang Pass

References

Mountain passes of the Philippines
Roads in Nueva Ecija
Roads in Nueva Vizcaya
Landforms of Nueva Ecija
Landforms of Nueva Vizcaya
World War II sites in the Philippines
Tourist attractions in Nueva Ecija
Tourist attractions in Nueva Vizcaya